Scott Logan (born 22 June 1976) is a former Scotland international rugby league footballer who last played as a  for the Canberra Raiders in the NRL. He has been described as, "one of the most durable props of the modern era."

Logan coached the Illawarra Cutters in the NSW Cup  competition.

Background
Logan was born in Wollongong, New South Wales, Australia.

Playing career
Logan started his football career at Brisbane Easts junior club, before making his first-team début 1996 for the Sydney City Roosters against North Queensland. He played with the Sydney Roosters for six years.

In 2000, Logan made his international début by representing Scotland in the World Cup. He stayed at the Sydney Roosters until 2001 when he signed a contract with Super League side Hull F.C. He spent three years at Hull F.C. but he suffered a series of injuries one being a badly broken ankle which took him almost a year to recover from. 

In 2004, he returned to Australia to play for the NRL side the South Sydney Rabbitohs for two years before agreeing a two-year deal with the Super League side the Wigan Warriors.

Logan played just one season with the Wigan Warriors in 2006 as he was one of a number of players released by Wigan at the end of the 2006 season; he signed a contract with Canberra Raiders for 2007. Following a very strong two seasons with the Raiders, being named the club's player of the year in 2007, Logan earned a contract extension, which will take to the end of 2009.

Logan was named in the Scotland training squad for the 2008 Rugby League World Cup, and went on to be named in the Scotland squad for the 2008 Rugby League World Cup. He was the only player remaining from the 2000 World Cup.

References

External links
(archived by web.archive.org) Canberra Raiders profile
(archived by web.archive.org) NRL.com profile
(archived by web.archive.org) Souths Profile
Wigan sign Logan on two-year deal
Statistics at rugbyleagueproject.org

1976 births
Living people
Australian people of Scottish descent
Australian rugby league coaches
Australian rugby league players
Canberra Raiders players
Hull F.C. players
Rugby league players from Wollongong
Rugby league props
Scotland national rugby league team players
South Sydney Rabbitohs players
Sydney Roosters players
Wigan Warriors players